South-West Deeps (West) MPA, along with the South West Deeps (East) MPA is an offshore Marine Conservation Zone (MCZ), approximately  off Land's End, Cornwall, England, in the Western Channel and Celtic Sea. It was one of twenty-seven MCZs designated on 21 November 2013 by the Marine and Coastal Access Act 2009 and is a predominantly sandy area of the continental shelf, supporting molluscs and crustaceans living in and on the mixed and coarse sediments.

Protected features
Subtidal course sediment, subtidal sand, subtidal mud and subtidal mixed sediments are broad-scale habitats which are protected in the MCZ, along with the  geologically important Celtic Sea Relict Sandbanks. The fan mussel (Atrina fragilis) is protected as a Species Feature of Conservation Interest and is found in only one other UK site, Small Isles (Scotland) MPA.

References

2013 establishments in the United Kingdom
Celtic Sea
Marine reserves of the United Kingdom
Protected areas established in 2013